Roland Mushat Frye (July 3, 1921 – January 13, 2005) was an American English literature scholar and theologian.

Career

Frye was born in Birmingham, Alabama.  In 1943 he interrupted his studies to enlist in the United States Army and fought at the Battle of the Bulge, winning a Bronze Star.

After the war, Frye taught at Emory University in Atlanta, Georgia and joined Folger Shakespeare Library in Washington D.C. as a research professor in residence. He returned to teaching in 1965, accepting a professorship at Penn.  He was Schelling Professor of English Literature University of Pennsylvania from 1965 until his retirement in 1983.  In 1978, he co-founded the Center of Theological Inquiry, an independent institution sponsored by the Princeton Theological Seminary.

Frye was awarded the Thomas Jefferson Award by the American Philosophical Society. The American Philosophical Society also awarded him both the "Henry Allen Moe Prize in the Humanities" in 1989 and the "John Frederick Lewis Prize" in 1975.  He was a Presbyterian elder.

Frye was an opponent of creationism. He was the editor of Is God a Creationist?: The Religious Case Against Creation-Science which was positively reviewed in The Quarterly Review of Biology as an "excellent refutation of the creationist's claim to speak for orthodox religion."

In 2021, Professor Frye's son published a 350-page biography of his father.  Renaissance Man: A Personal Biography of Roland Mushat Frye (Opus Publ.; www.politics-prose.com).

Publications

 Milton's Imagery and the Visual Arts: Iconographic Tradition in the Epic Poems
 Is God a Creationist?: The Religious Case Against Creation-Science
 God, Man and Satan: Patterns of Christian Thought and Life in "Paradise Lost", "Pilgrim's Progress" and the Great Theologians
 The Renaissance Hamlet: Issues and Responses in 1600
 Shakespeare: The Art of the Dramatist
 Shakespeare and Christian Doctrine
 The Reader's Bible - a Narrative - Selections from The King James Version
 Shakespeare's Life and Times: A Pictorial Record
 Perspective on Man - Literature and the Christian Tradition
 Language for God and Feminist Language: Problems and Principles
 The Teachings of Classical Puritanism on Conjugal Love

References

1921 births
2005 deaths
American academics of English literature
American literary critics
American theologians
United States Army personnel of World War II
Critics of creationism
Folger Shakespeare Library
University of Pennsylvania faculty
Writers about religion and science
Writers from Birmingham, Alabama